Dromaneen Castle is a fortified house and National Monument located in County Cork, Ireland.

It was one of the three main castles of the ancient O’Callaghan clan. The ruin is that of a Jocobean mansion and it is said to have been built by Caher O’Callaghan in around 1610. It was built to replace an older fortification, which had probably been in the style of a tower house. It was here that the Papal Nuncio Rinunicci was entertained in 1642. The castle was destroyed in 1652 during the Irish Confederate Wars. No effort was made to defend it and it was apparently occupied by Sir Richard Herrill, and Tynte of Youghal after which it was passed to Sir Richard Kyrle.

Location

References

National Monuments in County Cork
Castles in County Cork